Rafael Gasset Chinchilla ( November 1866 - 11 April 1927) was a Spanish lawyer, journalist, and politician. He served as the Minister of Agriculture and the Minister of Development several times during the regency of Maria Christina of Austria and later the reign of Alfonso XIII.

Biography 

He was director of El Imparcial following the death of his father, who founded the newspaper on 20 May 1884.

He began his political career as an independent politician, he participated in the 1891 elections and obtained a seat as a representative for the Santiago de Cuba district.

Gasset served as the Minister of Agriculture, Industry, Commerce, and Public Works twice: between 8 April and 23 October 1900; and between 20 July and 15 December 1903, the first Minister of Agriculture in Spanish history. He was one of the figures responsible for the rapprochement between Francisco Silvela and General Camilo García de Polavieja in 1898. Starting in 1899, Gasset assumed the ideas of the Aragonese politician Joaquín Costa, which he would try to put into practice in an attempt to improve agricultural irrigation, during the government of Francisco Silvela.

In 1903, during his second term, under the Fernández-Villaverde government, Gasset promoted a program that emphasized hydraulic works and the construction of local roads, however, his proposals were unattended at the end of 1903, the result of the change of prime minister. In 1905, he joined the Liberal Party and later served as the Minister of Public Works on 1 December 1905, under the Moret government.

He died on 11 April 1927, buried in Galapagar, where the remains of his second wife Rita Díez de Ulzurrun also rest. Puente Gasset was a bridge in Burgos dedicated to Rafael Gasset, built in 1926 and demolished in 2010. In Ciudad Real, built in 1915, is also dedicated in his name.

References

External links 

20th-century Spanish politicians
19th-century Spanish politicians
1866 births
1927 deaths
Interior ministers of Spain